The 1961 Rice Owls football team represented Rice University during the 1961 NCAA University Division football season. The Owls were led by 22nd-year head coach Jess Neely and played their home games at Rice Stadium in Houston, Texas. They competed as members of the Southwest Conference, finishing in third. Rice finished the regular season with a record of 7–3 and was ranked 17th in the final AP Poll, conducted before bowl season. As of 2018, this is the last time that Rice was featured in an AP Poll in any week, as Rice began to fade from the national spotlight in the 1960s. The Owls were invited to the 1961 Bluebonnet Bowl, played at their home Rice Stadium, where they were defeated by Kansas. Rice would not make another bowl game again until the 2006 New Orleans Bowl.

Schedule

References

Rice
Rice Owls football seasons
Rice Owls football